Konarak-e Pain (also Romanized as Konarak-e Pā’īn, Kanārak-e Pā’īn, and Konrok Pā‘īn; also known as Konarak-e Soflá and Kanārak) is a village in Gandoman Rural District, Gandoman District, Borujen County, Chaharmahal and Bakhtiari Province, Iran. At the 2006 census, its population was 382, in 81 families. The village is populated by Lurs.

References 

Populated places in Borujen County
Luri settlements in Chaharmahal and Bakhtiari Province